North Macedonia's football clubs have participated in European football competitions since 1961. Before 1992 North Macedonia was a part of Yugoslavia. Therefore, Macedonian teams represented this country and did not always have a guaranteed spot in European competitions.

All statistics and records are accurate as of 7 July 2022.

Statistics

 Most European Cup/Champions League competitions appeared in: 8 – Vardar 
 Most UEFA Cup/Europa League competitions appeared in: 11 – Vardar 
 Most Cup Winners' Cup competitions appeared in: 2 – Sloga Jugomagnat & Vardar 
 Most Intertoto Cup competitions appeared in: 5 – Pobeda
 Most competitions appeared in overall: 22 – Vardar 
 First match played: Dunfermline Athletic 5–0 Vardar (1961–62 Cup Winners' Cup R1)
 Most matches played: 72 – Vardar
 Most match wins: 21 – Rabotnički
 Most match draws: 17 – Vardar
 Most match losses: 39 – Vardar

 Biggest win (match): 6 goals
 Rabotnički 6–0 Skonto (2005–06 UEFA Champions League QR1) 
 Rabotnički 6–0 Lusitanos (2010–11 UEFA Europa League QR1) 
 Rabotnički 6–0 Tre Penne (2017–18 UEFA Europa League QR1) 
 Biggest win (aggregate): 11 goals
 Rabotnički 11–0 Lusitanos (2010–11 UEFA Europa League QR1) 
 Biggest defeat (match): 7 goals
 Bastia 7–0 Makedonija GP (1998 UEFA Intertoto Cup R2)
 Biggest defeat (aggregate): 11 goals
 Bashkimi 0–11 Maccabi Petah Tikva (2005–06 UEFA Cup QR2)

As of 8 August 2018.

UEFA coefficient and ranking

For the 2018–19 UEFA competitions, the associations will be allocated places according to their 2017 UEFA country coefficients, which will take into account their performance in European competitions from 2012–13 to 2016–17. In the 2017 rankings that will be used for the 2018–19 European competitions, North Macedonia's coefficient points total is 5.625. After earning a score of 1.250 during the 2016–17 European campaign, Macedonia is ranked by UEFA as the 42nd best association in Europe out of 54.

 40  6.375
 41  6.125
 42  5.625
 43  5.250
 44  5.250
 Full list

UEFA country coefficient history
(As of 23 July 2019), Source: Bert Kassies website.

Appearances in UEFA competitions

App. = Appearances; P = Matches played; W = Matches won; D = Matches drawn; L = Matches lost; UCL = UEFA Champions League; UC = UEFA Cup; UEL = UEFA Europa League; UECL = UEFA Europa Conference League; CWC = UEFA Cup Winners' Cup; UIC = UEFA Intertoto Cup.

Competitions

Active

European Cup/Champions League

UEFA Cup/Europa League

1 Game originally finished 0–0, but was later awarded 3–0 for Bashkimi because was Žepče fielded ineligible player.

UEFA Europa Conference League

Defunct

Cup Winners' Cup

Intertoto Cup

Balkans Cup

Mitropa Cup

Record by country of opposition
Updated on 31 July 2021.

References

External links
UEFA Website
Rec.Sport.Soccer Statistics Foundation

European football clubs in international competitions